The Arabic periodical al-Bayān (English: "announcement" or "declaration") was published once or twice a month from 1 March 1897 until 16 August 1898. It was edited in Cairo by Ibrahīm Al-Yāziǧī (1847–1906) and Bišāra Zalzal (1851–1905) and was the successor of the medical journal aṭ-Ṭabīb (1884–1885). Since 1898, Al-Yāziǧī, a linguist and journalist from Lebanon, particularly built up his reputation as the chief editor of the journal aḍ-Ḍiyāʾ (1898-1906). Apart from scientific articles, al-Bayān focused on cultural and anthropological topics such as language and education.

References

Further reading
 Ayalon, Ami (1995): The Press in the Arab Middle East, New York.
 Glaß, Dagmar (2004): Der al-Muqtaṭaf und seine Öffentlichkeit. Aufklärung, Räsonnement und Meinungsstreit in der frühen arabischen Zeitschriftenkommunikation, Band I, Würzburg, pp. 42, 113.
 Hanna, Elias (1993): La presse Arabe, Paris.
 Hartmanns, Martin (1899): The Arabic Press of Egypt, London.
 Rugh, William A. (1979): The Arab Press. News Media and Political Process in the Arab World, New York.
 Soueid, Père Paul (1969): Ibrahim Al-Yazigi, L'Homme et son Œuvre, Beirut.

External links
 al-Bayān, digitized online version
 al- ǧāmiʻa, digitized online version
 ad- ḍīyāʻ, digitized online version

Arabic-language magazines
Cultural magazines
Defunct magazines published in Egypt
Irregularly published magazines
Magazines established in 1897
Magazines disestablished in 1898
Magazines published in Cairo